Stanley Milton Burgess is  Professor Emeritus, Missouri State University. He is author or editor of several books, including The Holy Spirit: Medieval Roman Catholic and Reformation Traditions and The New International Dictionary of Pentecostal and Charismatic Movements.

Early life
Stanley Milton Burgess was born on November 27, 1937 in Nagercoil, India to Assemblies of God missionaries, John and Bernice Burgess. The Burgess were establishing Bethel Bible College in the State of Travancore (now Kerala). In 1950 the Burgess returned to the United States. Stanley began to attend Beecher High School, near his home in Flint, Michigan and graduated at 15. He received his BA and MA in 1958 and 1959 from the University of Michigan, and his Ph.D in History from the University of Missouri-Columbia in 1971.

Main works

References

Pentecostal theologians
Pneumatologists
Assemblies of God people
1937 births
Living people
People from Muskegon Heights, Michigan